Blame the Dead is the sixth novel by English author Gavin Lyall, first published in December 1972. It was followed by Judas Country which was the final novel written by the author in the first person narrative.

Plot introduction
James Card, security consultant and ex-British Army intelligence officer takes on a job as bodyguard to Lloyd's of London underwriter Martin Fenwick for a trip to France.  When his client is assassinated, he takes matters into his own hands to track down the killer. His only clue is a children's colouring book in a plain brown paper wrapper package. Fenwick’s young, beautiful widow is strangely without any sorrow at her husband’s death, but their son David, is grimly determined that he will find his father’s murderer regardless of the risk.

Literary significance & criticism
The novel was praised the Chicago Tribune as “Lyall at his fleet and fearful best".

Notes 

1972 British novels
Novels by Gavin Lyall
British thriller novels
Hodder & Stoughton books